With Trumpets Flaring is the 2009 studio album from Canadian band Gregory Pepper & His Problems, released on Fake Four Inc.

Track listing

2009 albums
Gregory Pepper albums